Piesse is a surname. Notable people with the surname include:

 George William Septimus Piesse (1820 – 1882), English chemist and perfumer
 Alfred Piesse (1866–1939), Australian politician
 Arnold Piesse (1872–1935), Australian politician
 Bonnie Piesse (born 1983), Australian actress and musician
 Charles Piesse (1855–1914), Australian politician
 Edmund Piesse (1900–1952), Australian politician
 Frederick Henry Piesse (1853–1912), Australian politician
 Frederick William Piesse (1848–1902), Australian politician
 Harold Piesse (1884–1944), Australian politician
 Ken Piesse, Australian journalist
 Paul Piesse, New Zealand politician
 Winifred Piesse (born 1923), Australian politician

See also
 Piesse Brook, Western Australia